The 1979 German Formula Three Championship was a multi-event motor racing championship for single-seat open wheel formula racing cars held across Europe. The championship featured drivers competing in two-litre Formula Three racing cars which conformed to the technical regulations, or formula, for the championship. It commenced on 11 March at Circuit Zolder and ended at Kassel-Calden on 7 October after seven rounds (the first Nürburgring round was cancelled due to snowfall). 

Klaus Zimmermann Racing Team driver Michael Korten became a champion. He won races at Fassberg, Nürburgring and Kassel-Calden. Hans-Georg Bürger won race at Diepholz and finished as runner-up. Walter Lechner completed the top-three in the drivers' standings. Ernst Maring, Thierry Boutsen and Michael Bleekemolen were the only other drivers who were able to win a race in the season.

Teams and drivers

Calendar
All rounds were held in West Germany, excepting Zolder rounds that were held in Belgium.

Results

Championship standings
Points are awarded as follows:

References

External links
 

German Formula Three Championship seasons
Formula Three season
1979 in Formula Three